Bovina is an unincorporated community in Lincoln County, Colorado, United States.  The ZIP Code of Bovina (80818) is held at the Genoa Post Office.

History
A post office called Bovina was established in 1899, and remained in operation until 1955.  The community was named for nearby cattle ranches, "Bovina" meaning "cattle" in Spanish.

Geography
Bovina is located at  (39.285589, -103.275624). Bovina is located on the old US 24 highway. Just off Interstate 70 at exit 376, and along the Union Pacific Railroad line between Limon and Burlington. It is located approximately 7 miles E of Genoa and 8 miles W of Arriba. The town is located on an unnamed creek. Recently, homes have been constructed in the town's area.

See also
 Lincoln County, Colorado
 State of Colorado
 List of cities and towns in Colorado

References

External links
 Lincoln County Website 

Unincorporated communities in Lincoln County, Colorado
Unincorporated communities in Colorado